Rizal Tower is a residential skyscraper ranked officially as the 37th tallest building in the Philippines since 2000. It has 47 stories. The building is located on 31 Residential Drive, Rockwell Center, in Makati. The amenities in the building include a swimming pool, a library, a function room, a helipad, an access tunnel to the neighboring Power Plant Mall, and three gardens (Oval Garden, Sunken Garden, and Pocket Garden) in a tropical landscape setting. The building is managed by Rockwell Property Management Corporation.

See also 
 List of tallest buildings in the Philippines

References 

Skyscrapers in Makati
Skyscraper office buildings in Metro Manila
Skidmore, Owings & Merrill buildings
Office buildings completed in 2000
20th-century architecture in the Philippines